Elections to Londonderry City Council were held on 18 May 1977 on the same day as the other Northern Irish local government elections. The election used five district electoral areas to elect a total of 27 councillors.

Election results

Note: "Votes" are the first preference votes.

Districts summary

|- class="unsortable" align="centre"
!rowspan=2 align="left"|Ward
! % 
!Cllrs
! % 
!Cllrs
! %
!Cllrs
! %
!Cllrs
! % 
!Cllrs
! % 
!Cllrs
!rowspan=2|TotalCllrs
|- class="unsortable" align="center"
!colspan=2 bgcolor="" | SDLP
!colspan=2 bgcolor="" | UUP
!colspan=2 bgcolor="" | Nationalist
!colspan=2 bgcolor="" | Alliance
!colspan=2 bgcolor="" | DUP
!colspan=2 bgcolor="white"| Others
|-
|align="left"|Area A
|bgcolor="#99FF66"|40.2
|bgcolor="#99FF66"|3
|36.8
|2
|0.0
|0
|9.7
|0
|12.7
|1
|0.6
|0
|6
|-
|align="left"|Area B
|25.4
|1
|bgcolor="40BFF5"|29.0
|bgcolor="40BFF5"|2
|0.0
|0
|19.0
|1
|15.9
|1
|10.7
|0
|5
|-
|align="left"|Area C
|bgcolor="#99FF66"|56.6
|bgcolor="#99FF66"|3
|0.0
|0
|23.0
|2
|6.7
|0
|0.0
|0
|13.7
|0
|5
|-
|align="left"|Area D
|bgcolor="#99FF66"|50.2
|bgcolor="#99FF66"|3
|17.8
|1
|19.4
|1
|7.5
|0
|0.0
|0
|5.1
|0
|5
|-
|align="left"|Area E
|bgcolor="#99FF66"|46.4
|bgcolor="#99FF66"|3
|22.7
|1
|12.0
|1
|12.7
|1
|0.0
|0
|6.2
|0
|5
|- class="unsortable" class="sortbottom" style="background:#C9C9C9"
|align="left"| Total
|42.1
|13
|23.5
|6
|8.9
|4
|11.9
|2
|6.7
|2
|6.9
|0
|27
|-
|}

Districts results

Area A

1973: 3 x United Loyalist, 2 x SDLP, 1 x Alliance
1977: 3 x SDLP, 2 x UUP, 1 x DUP
1973-1977 Change: UUP (two seats), DUP and SDLP gain from United Loyalists (three seats) and Alliance

Area B

1973: 3 x United Loyalist, 1 x SDLP, 1 x Alliance
1977: 2 x UUP, 1 x DUP, 1 x SDLP, 1 x Alliance
1973-1977 Change: UUP (two seats) and DUP gain from United Loyalist (three seats)

Area C

1973: 3 x SDLP, 1 x Nationalist, 1 x Republican Clubs
1977: 3 x SDLP, 2 x Nationalist
1973-1977 Change: Nationalist gain from Republican Clubs

Area D

1973: 2 x SDLP, 1 x Nationalist, 1 x Alliance, 1 x United Loyalist
1977: 3 x SDLP, 1 x Nationalist, 1 x UUP
1973-1977 Change: SDLP and UUP gain from Alliance and United Loyalist

Area E

1973: 2 x SDLP, 2 x United Loyalist, 1 x Alliance, 1 x Nationalist
1977: 3 x SDLP, 1 x UUP, 1 x Alliance, 1 x Nationalist
1973-1977 Change: SDLP gain from United Loyalist

References

Derry City Council elections
Derry